In mathematics, in particular linear algebra, the Bunch–Nielsen–Sorensen formula, named after James R. Bunch, Christopher P. Nielsen and Danny C. Sorensen, expresses the eigenvectors of the sum of a symmetric matrix  and the outer product, of vector  with itself.

Statement
In the special case when  is diagonal, the eigenvectors  of  can be written

 

where  is a number that makes the vector  normalized.

Derivation

Remarks

Numerical stability of the computation is studied by Gu and Eisenstat.

See also
 Sherman–Morrison formula

References

External links 
 Rank-One Modification of the Symmetric Eigenproblem at EUDML
 Some Modified Matrix Eigenvalue Problems
 A Stable and Efficient Algorithm for the Rank-One Modification of the Symmetric Eigenproblem

Linear algebra